Sodom Mill Historic and Archeological District is a historic district in Exeter, Rhode Island.  It includes the foundational remnants of a small early-19th century mill complex, including a dam and raceway, as well as the ruins of several 19th-century dwellings.  The oldest mill on the site was built in 1814.

The district was added to the National Register of Historic Places in 1980.

See also
National Register of Historic Places listings in Washington County, Rhode Island

References

Exeter, Rhode Island
Historic districts in Washington County, Rhode Island
Historic districts on the National Register of Historic Places in Rhode Island